The 1999–2000 NBA season was the Timberwolves' 11th season in the National Basketball Association. The Timberwolves acquired the sixth pick in the 1999 NBA draft from the New Jersey Nets, and selected Wally Szczerbiak out of Miami University. For the season opener, the Timberwolves traveled to Tokyo, Japan to play their first two games against the Sacramento Kings. After a 7–5 start, the Timberwolves struggled posting an 8-game losing streak in December, but then won 20 of their next 25 games, and held a 27–20 record at the All-Star break. The Timberwolves enjoyed their first 50-win season finishing third in the Midwest Division with a 50–32 record.

Kevin Garnett averaged 22.9 points, 11.8 rebounds, 5.0 assists, 1.5 steals and 1.6 blocks per game, and was named to the All-NBA First Team, and to the NBA All-Defensive First Team, while being selected for the 2000 NBA All-Star Game. He also finished in second place in Most Valuable Player voting behind Shaquille O'Neal of the Los Angeles Lakers. In addition, Terrell Brandon averaged 17.1 points, 8.9 assists and 1.9 steals per game, while Szczerbiak provided the team with 11.6 points per game, and was named to the NBA All-Rookie First Team, and Malik Sealy contributed 11.3 points per game. Off the bench, Joe Smith provided with 9.9 points and 6.2 rebounds per game, while Anthony Peeler contributed 9.8 points per game, and second-year center Rasho Nesterovic averaged 5.7 points and 4.6 rebounds per game as the team's starting center. 

However, in the Western Conference First Round of the playoffs, the Timberwolves lost in four games to the Portland Trail Blazers. Following the season, Bobby Jackson signed as a free agent with the Sacramento Kings.

Tragedy struck on May 20, 2000, when Sealy died in a car accident, where he was killed by a drunk driver, who was on the wrong side of the road; Sealy, who was 30 years old, was just coming home from a birthday party for his teammate Garnett, who had just turned 24 years old on May 19, 2000. The driver involved in the crash, Souksangouane Phengsene, was sentenced to four years in prison. A notable highlight of the season included Sealy hitting a game winning three-pointer in a 101–100 home win against his former team, the Indiana Pacers on January 17, 2000.

Draft picks

Roster

Roster Notes
 Shooting guard Malik Sealy died in a car accident on May 20.

Regular season

Season standings

 z - clinched division title
 y - clinched division title
 x - clinched playoff spot

Record vs. opponents

Playoffs

|- align="center" bgcolor="#ffcccc"
| 1
| April 23
| @ Portland
| L 88–91
| Malik Sealy (23)
| Kevin Garnett (10)
| Terrell Brandon (12)
| Rose Garden19,980
| 0–1
|- align="center" bgcolor="#ffcccc"
| 2
| April 26
| @ Portland
| L 82–86
| Kevin Garnett (23)
| Kevin Garnett (10)
| Terrell Brandon (6)
| Rose Garden20,568
| 0–2
|- align="center" bgcolor="#ccffcc"
| 3
| April 30
| Portland
| W 94–87
| Terrell Brandon (28)
| Kevin Garnett (13)
| Terrell Brandon (12)
| Target Center19,006
| 1–2
|- align="center" bgcolor="#ffcccc"
| 4
| May 2
| Portland
| L 77–85
| Kevin Garnett (17)
| Kevin Garnett (10)
| Kevin Garnett (9)
| Target Center19,006
| 1–3
|-

Player statistics

NOTE: Please write the players statistics in alphabetical order by last name.

Season

Playoffs

Awards and records
 Kevin Garnett, All-NBA First Team
 Kevin Garnett, NBA All-Defensive First Team
 Wally Szczerbiak, NBA All-Rookie Team 1st Team

Transactions

References

Minnesota Timberwolves seasons
Minnesota
1999 in sports in Minnesota
2000 in sports in Minnesota